The American Spinal Injury Association (ASIA), formed in 1973, publishes the International Standards for Neurological Classification of Spinal Cord Injury (ISNCSCI), which is a neurological exam widely used to document sensory and motor impairments following spinal cord injury (SCI). The ASIA assessment is the gold standard for assessing SCI. ASIA is one of the affiliated societies of the International Spinal Cord Society.

The exam is based on neurological responses, touch and pinprick sensations tested in each dermatome, and strength of the muscles that control key motions on both sides of the body.  Muscle strength is scored on a scale of 0–5 according to the adjacent table, and sensation is graded on a scale of 0–2: 0 is no sensation, 1 is altered or decreased sensation, and 2 is full sensation.  Each side of the body is graded independently. When an area is not available (e.g. because of an amputation or cast), it is recorded as "NT", "not testable". The ISNCSCI exam is used for determining the neurological level of injury (the lowest area of full, uninterrupted sensation and function).

The completeness or incompleteness of the injury is measured by the ASIA Impairment Scale (AIS).

References

Bibliography

External links
 American Spinal Injury Association homepage

Disability organizations based in the United States
Surgical organizations based in the United States
Neurotrauma